Ernst Heyne (1833-1905) was a German entomologist who specialised in Lepidoptera.
He was the father of Alexander Heyne and Martin Heyne. The Heyne family  were natural history dealers, booksellers and publishers in Berlin and London.  Ernst Heyne was a friend and business associate of insect dealers Otto Staudinger and Andreas Bang-Haas.

References
Korschefsky, R. 1929: [Heyne, A.]  Dt. ent. Z. 73-74  
Möbius, E. 1943 Dt. Ent. Z. Iris 57 1-27

German entomologists
1833 births
1905 deaths